Albion railway station may refer to:

Albion railway station, Brisbane, Australia
Albion railway station, Melbourne, Australia
Albion railway station (England), a closed station in England
Albion station (Michigan), Albion, Michigan